This is a list of fellows of the Royal Society elected in 1987.

Fellows

Robert McNeill Alexander
George Brownlee
Bruce Macintosh Cattanach
John Frederick Clarke  (1927–2013)
William Compston
Donald Watts Davies  (1924–2000)
Peter Charles Doherty
Duncan Dowson
John William Fozard  (1928–1996)
Coluthur Gopalan
Peter Raymond Grant
James Alexander Green
Norman Neill Greenwood  (1949–2012)
Bryan Desmond Harrison
Michael Patrick Hassell
Anthony Rex Hunter
Herbert Eric Huppert
Olga Kennard  (d. 2023)
Anthony John Kirby
William Graeme Laver  (d. 2008)
Rodney Loudon
Nicholas John Mackintosh
Sir Peter Mansfield
Terence Arthur Mansfield
James Desmond Caldwell McConnell
Peter Hague Nye  (d. 2009)
David Ian Olive  (1937–2012)
Oliver Penrose
John Douglas Pettigrew
Terence Howard Rabbitts
Benton Seymour Rabinovitch
Edward Peter Raynes
Peter Neville Robson  (d. 2010)
Sir Michael Llewellyn Rutter (b.1933)
Roman Mieczyslaw Sawicki  (1930–1990)
Anthony James Merrill Spencer  (1929–2008)
Patrick Christopher Steptoe  (1913–1988)
William Thomas Tutte  (1917–2002)
James Kay Graham Watson
Sir Martin Francis Wood

Foreign members

David Baltimore (1938–
Norman Ernest Borlaug  (1914–2009)
Walter Gilbert
Vitaly Lazarevich Ginzburg  (1916–2009)
George Rankine Irwin  (1907–1998)
Rudolph Arthur Marcus (b.1923)

Other

Sir Peter Markham Scott  (1909–1989) (elected under statute 12)
Anne Elizabeth Alice Louise Princess Royal (elected a Royal Fellow)

References

1987
1987 in science
1987 in the United Kingdom